Anaperus may refer to:
 Anaperus (echinoderm), a genus of echinoderms in the family Cucumariidae
 Anaperus, a synonym for Cogia, a genus of butterflies
 Anaperus, a synonym for Thalassoanaperus, a genus of acoels